Edwin Soenarto (born 16 August 1987 in Heerenveen) is a Dutch footballer who played for Eerste Divisie club FC Volendam during the 2010-2011 football season. But his real breakthrough only came when he scored the winning goal on the 20th of September 2017 in the KNVB cup match against FC Utrecht.

References

1987 births
Living people
Dutch footballers
FC Volendam players
Eerste Divisie players
People from Maarssen 
Association footballers not categorized by position
Footballers from Utrecht (province)